The Rock: Stone Cold Country 2001 is the 57th studio album by American country music singer George Jones, released on September 11, 2001 on the Bandit Records label.

Content
The lead single was "Beer Run (B Double E Double Are You In?)", a duet with Garth Brooks that was also found on his 2001 album Scarecrow. Significant tracks include "50,000 Names", written and originally recorded by Jamie O'Hara as a tribute to fallen soldiers of the Vietnam War, and "Tramp On Your Street", which marks the first time a Billy Joe Shaver song appeared on a Jones album. "What I Didn't Do" had been previously recorded by Steve Wariner.

Track listing

Personnel
Adapted from The Rock liner notes.

On all tracks except 2, 3, 6, 11
Musicians
Monisa Angell - viola
Eddie Bayers - drums
Richard Bennett - electric guitar
Bruce Christensen - viola
Stuart Duncan - fiddle, mandolin
Paul Franklin - steel guitar
Steve Gibson - acoustic guitar, electric guitar
Emory Gordy Jr. - bass guitar
Gerald Greer - violin
Connie Heard - violin
John Hobbs - piano, Hammond B-3 organ
John Hughey - steel guitar
Carl Jackson - background vocals
Anthony LaMarchina - cello
Patty Loveless - background vocals
Liana Manis - background vocals
Brent Mason - electric guitar
Kathryn Plummer - viola
Mike Rojas - keyboards
John Wesley Ryles - background vocals
Lisa Silver - background vocals
Pamela Sixfin - violin
Chris Teal - violin
Gary VanOsdale - viola
Biff Watson - acoustic guitar
John Wiggins - background vocals
Dennis Wilson - background vocals
Curtis Young - background vocals

Terchnical
Drew Bollman - assistant
Emory Gordy Jr. - producer
Todd Gunnerson - assistant
Russ Martin - recording
Glenn Meadows - mastering
Justin Niebank - recording, mixing
Jason Piske - assistant
Dennis Ritchie - assistant

Track 2 only
Musicians
Bruce Bouton - steel guitar
Mark Casstevens - acoustic guitar
Mike Chapman - bass guitar
Rob Hajacos - fiddle
Chris Leuzinger - electric guitar
Joey Miskulin - accordion
Milton Sledge - drums
Bobby Wood - keyboards

Technical
Eric Conn - digital editing
Duke Duczer - assistant
Carlos Grier - digital editing
John Kelton - engineering
Mark Miller - mixing, recording
Denny Purcell - mastering
Allen Reynolds - producer
Keith Stegall - assistant

Tracks 3, 6, 11
Musicians
Eddie Bayers - drums
Stuart Duncan - fiddle
Paul Franklin - steel guitar
Brent Mason - electric guitar
Gary Prim - piano
John Wesley Ryles - background vocals
David Smith - bass guitar
Bruce Watkins - acoustic guitar

Technical
Steve Harbison - assistant
John Kelton - recording, mixing
Matt Rovey - assistant
Keith Stegall - producer
Hank Williams - mastering

Visual
Missy Herrington - design
Beth Lee - art direction
Jim Shea - photography

Year-end charts

References

George Jones albums
2001 albums
Albums produced by Keith Stegall
Albums produced by Emory Gordy Jr.
BNA Records albums